The Zuytdorp worm-lizard (Aprasia smithi), also known commonly as Smith's legless lizard, is a species of lizard in the family Pygopodidae. The species is endemic to Australia.

Etymology
The specific name, smithi, is in honor of Australian herpetologist Lawrence Alec Smith (born 1944).

Geographic range
A. smithi is found in the Australian state of Western Australia

Habitat
The preferred natural habitats of A. smithi are grassland, and shrubland.

Reproduction
A smithi is oviparous.

References

Further reading
Cogger HG (2014). Reptiles and Amphibians of Australia, Seventh Edition. Clayton, Victoria, Australia: CSIRO Publishing. xxx + 1,033 pp. .
 
Storr GM (1970). "Aprasia smithi a New Worm-Lizard (Pygopodidae) from Western Australia". Western Australian Naturalist 11 (6): 141. (Aprasia smithi, new species).
Wells RW (2007). "Some taxonomic and nomenclatural considerations on the class Reptilia. A review of species in the genus Aprasia GRAY 1839 (Apraisiaidae) including the description of a new genus". Australian Biodiversity Record (6): 1–17. (Abilaena smithi, new combination).
Wilson S, Swan G (2013). A Complete Guide to Reptiles of Australia, Fourth Edition. Sydney: New Holland Publishers. 522 pp. .

Pygopodids of Australia
Aprasia
Reptiles described in 1970
Taxa named by Glen Milton Storr